Suassuna is a surname. Notable people with the surname include:

Ariano Suassuna (1927–2014), Brazilian playwright and author
João Suassuna (1886–1930), Brazilian politician
Reinaldo Ramos Suassuna (born 1938), Brazilian capoeira practitioner